is a Japanese sprinter. He competed in the men's 100 metres at the 2017 World Championships in Athletics. Tada also represented Japan at the 2020 Summer Olympics in Tokyo, competing in the 100 metre and 4x100 metre relay events.

Personal bests
Information from World Athletics profile unless otherwise noted.

Outdoor
100 metres – 10.01 (+2.0 m/s, Tottori 2021)
200 metres – 21.72 (+0.9 m/s, Hachioji 2021)
Indoor
60 metres – 6.56 (Madrid 2020)
200 metres – 22.42 (College Station 2017)

References

External links
 

1996 births
Living people
Japanese male sprinters
World Athletics Championships athletes for Japan
World Athletics Championships medalists
Universiade medalists in athletics (track and field)
Athletes (track and field) at the 2018 Asian Games
Asian Games gold medalists for Japan
Medalists at the 2018 Asian Games
Asian Games medalists in athletics (track and field)
Universiade gold medalists for Japan
People from Higashiōsaka
Medalists at the 2017 Summer Universiade
Athletes (track and field) at the 2020 Summer Olympics
Olympic athletes of Japan
20th-century Japanese people
21st-century Japanese people